= Uno Palmström =

Swedish journalist and author

Uno Palmström (9 August 1947 - 27 April 2003) was a Swedish journalist and author. He also wrote the script for two TV-series for SVT.

== Bibliography ==
- 1976 – Kuppen: thriller (Askild & Kärnekull, 1976)
- 1978 – System 84 (Askild & Kärnekull, 1978)
- 1980 – Mördare! Mördare!: (Arbetarkultur, 1980)
- 1982 – Där kanonen blommar: Arbetarkultur, 1982)
- 1983 – Slutstation Stockholm (Arbetarkultur, 1983)
- 1984 – Maratonmannen: en kriminalroman (Arbetarkultur, 1984)
- 1986 – ... om någon är född eller död (Arbetarkultur, 1986)
- 1988 – Blåvitt: historien om ett mästarlag, Prisma, 1988)
- 1989 – Hundarna yla för lik (Arbetarkultur, 1989)
- 1990 – Bara till graven (Arbetarkultur, 1990)
- 1992 – Kommissarie Holgersson: Mordisk resa genom Sverige ( Läsförlaget AB, 1992)

== TV ==
- 1980 – Mördare! Mördare! (SVT)
- 1985 – Nya Dagbladet (TV-serie) (SVT)
